The 2016 Houston Astros season was the 55th season for the Major League Baseball (MLB) franchise in Houston, Texas, their 52nd as the Astros, fourth in both the American League (AL) and AL West division, and 17th at Minute Maid Park. After a 7–17 start in the month of April, the Astros produced a winning record over their next four months, highlighted by an 18–8 record in June. After going 12–15 in September, the Astros were eliminated from playoff contention. They finished in third place in the AL West with a final record of 84–78, eleven games back of the division champion Texas Rangers.  As of 2022, this was the last time the Astros had missed the playoffs.

Offseason
 11/13/15 – Astros re-signed OF Colby Rasmus to the team's qualifying offer of one year, $15.8 million.
 11/19/15 – Astros traded IF Jonathan Villar to the Milwaukee Brewers for RHP Cy Sneed.
 11/25/15 – Astros traded IF Jed Lowrie to the Oakland Athletics for RHP Brendan McCurry.
 12/2/15 – Astros traded C Hank Conger to the Tampa Bay Rays for cash considerations.
 12/2/15 – Astros non-tendered 1B Chris Carter, making him a free agent.
 12/11/15 – Astros re-signed LHP Tony Sipp to three year, $18 million deal.
 12/12/15 – Astros traded RHP Vincent Velasquez, RHP Mark Appel, LHP Brett Oberholtzer, RHP Harold Arauz, and RHP Thomas Eshelman to the Philadelphia Phillies for RHP Ken Giles and IF Jonathan Arauz.
 1/28/16 – Astros signed free agent RHP Doug Fister to one year, $7 million deal.

Spring training
2016 marked the final year the Astros played their spring training ball at Osceola County Stadium in Kissimmee, Florida, where Houston had played since 1985. In 2017, the Astros moved to The Ballpark of The Palm Beaches, a brand new stadium located in West Palm Beach, Florida that Houston shares with the Washington Nationals.

Houston finished fifth in the Grapefruit League with an 18–11 record, four games back of the champion Nationals.

Regular season

Season standings

American League West

American League Wild Card

Record against opponents

Game log

|- style="text-align:center; background:#bbb;"
| — || April 4 || @ Yankees ||colspan="8" | Postponed (snow). Makeup date: April 5. 
|- style="text-align:center; background:#cfc;"
| 1 || April 5 || @ Yankees || 5–3 || Keuchel (1–0) || Betances (0–1) || Gregerson (1) || 47,820 || 1–0 ||W1
|- style="text-align:center; background:#fbb;"
| 2 || April 6 || @ Yankees || 6–16 || Pineda (1–0) || McHugh (0–1) || Nova (1) || 37,493 || 1–1 ||L1
|- style="text-align:center; background:#fbb;"
| 3 || April 7 || @ Yankees || 5–8 || Shreve (1–0) || Harris (0–1) || Miller (1) || 30,003 || 1–2 ||L2
|- style="text-align:center; background:#fbb;"
| 4 || April 8 || @ Brewers || 4–6 || Anderson (1–0)  || Feldman (0–1)  || Jeffress (2) || 30,100 || 1–3 ||L3
|- style="text-align:center; background:#cfc;"
| 5 || April 9 || @ Brewers || 6–4 || Fister (1–0) || Peralta (0–2) || Gregerson (2) || 28,127 || 2–3 ||W1
|- style="text-align:center; background:#fbb;"
| 6 || April 10 || @ Brewers || 2–3 || Nelson (1–1) || Keuchel (1–1) || Jeffress (3) || 28,441 || 2–4 ||L1
|- style="text-align:center; background:#cfc;"
| 7 || April 11 || Royals || 8–2 || McHugh (1–1) || Young (0–2) || — || 43,332 || 3–4 ||W1
|- style="text-align:center; background:#fbb;"
| 8 || April 12 || Royals || 2–3 || Medlen (1–0) || Fiers (0–1) || Davis (3) || 21,027 || 3–5 ||L1
|- style="text-align:center; background:#fbb;"
| 9 || April 13 || Royals || 2–4 || Hochevar (1–0) || Giles (0–1) || Soria (1) || 24,109 || 3–6 ||L2
|- style="text-align:center; background:#fbb;"
| 10 || April 14 || Royals || 2–6 || Kennedy (2–0) || Fister (1–1) || Davis (4) || 21,203 || 3–7 ||L3
|- style="text-align:center; background:#cfc;
| 11 || April 15 || Tigers || 1–0 || Keuchel (2–1) || Pelfrey (0–2) || Gregerson (3) || 30,092 || 4–7 ||W1
|- style="text-align:center; background:#fbb;"
| 12 || April 16 || Tigers || 3–5 || Verlander (1–1) || McHugh (1–2) || Rodríguez (3) || 30,013  || 4–8 ||L1
|- style="text-align:center; background:#cfc;
| 13 || April 17 || Tigers || 5–4 || Fiers (1–1) || Sánchez (2–1) || Gregerson (4) || 30,657 || 5–8 ||W1
|- style="text-align:center; background:#fbb;"
| 14 || April 19 || @ Rangers || 5–7 || Holland (2–0) || Feldman (0–2) || Tolleson (4) || 24,181 || 5–9 ||L1
|- style="text-align:center; background:#fbb;"
| 15 || April 20 || @ Rangers || 1–2 || Hamels (3–0) || Fister (1–2) || Tolleson (5) || 25,821 || 5–10 ||L2
|- style="text-align:center; background:#fbb;"
| 16 || April 21 || @ Rangers || 4–7 || Griffin (2–0) || Keuchel (2–2) || Tolleson (6) || 25,886 || 5–11 ||L3
|- style="text-align:center; background:#fbb;"
| 17 || April 22 || Red Sox || 2–6 || Wright (1–2) || McHugh (1–3) || Kimbrel (5) || 26,672 || 5–12 ||L4
|- style="text-align:center; background:#cfc;
| 18 || April 23 || Red Sox || 8–3 || Fiers (2–1) || Buchholz (0–2) || — || 40,232 || 6–12 ||W1
|- style="text-align:center; background:#fbb;"
| 19 || April 24 || Red Sox || 5–7 (12) || Hembree (1–0) || Giles (0–2) || — || 32,416 || 6–13 ||L1
|- style="text-align:center; background:#fbb;"
| 20 || April 25 || @ Mariners || 2–3 || Walker (2–0) || Fister (1–3) || Cishek (5) || 14,832 || 6–14 ||L2
|- style="text-align:center; background:#fbb;"
| 21 || April 26 || @ Mariners || 1–11 || Karns (2–1) || Keuchel (2–3) || — || 13,821 || 6–15 ||L3
|- style="text-align:center; background:#cfc;
| 22 || April 27 || @ Mariners || 7–4 || McHugh (2–3) || Iwakuma (0–3) || — || 14,173 || 7–15 ||W1
|- style="text-align:center; background:#fbb;"
| 23 || April 29 || @ Athletics || 4–7 || Madson (1–0) || Sipp (0–1) || — || 20,159 || 7–16 ||L1
|- style="text-align:center; background:#fbb;"
| 24 || April 30 || @ Athletics || 0–2 || Hahn (1–0) || Devenski (0–1) || Madson (8) || 23,084 || 7–17 ||L2
|-

|- style="text-align:center; background:#cfc;
| 25 || May 1 || @ Athletics || 2–1 || Fister (2–3) || Hill (3–3) || Gregerson (5) || 24,135 || 8–17 ||W1
|- style="text-align:center; background:#fbb;"
| 26 || May 2 || Twins || 2–6 || Berríos (1–1) || Keuchel (2–4) || — || 18,243 || 8–18 ||L1
|- style="text-align:center; background:#cfc;
| 27 || May 3 || Twins || 6–4 || McHugh (3–3) || Meyer (0–1) || Gregerson (6) || 21,153 || 9–18 ||W1
|- style="text-align:center; background:#cfc;
| 28 || May 4 || Twins || 16–4 || Feldman (1–2) || Hughes (1–5) || — || 20,847 || 10–18 ||W2
|- style="text-align:center; background:#fbb;"
| 29 || May 5 || Mariners || 3–6 || Vincent (2–1) || Gregerson (0–1) || Cishek (9) || 20,151 || 10–19 ||L1
|- style="text-align:center; background:#cfc;"
| 30 || May 6 || Mariners || 6–3 || Fister (3–3) || Walker (2–2) || Gregerson (7) || 25,413 || 11–19 ||W1
|- style="text-align:center; background:#fbb;"
| 31 || May 7 || Mariners || 2–3 (10) || Cishek (2–1) || Sipp (0–2) || — || 31,559 || 11–20 ||L1
|- style="text-align:center; background:#cfc;"
| 32 || May 8 || Mariners || 5–1 || McHugh (4–3) || Iwakuma (1–4) || — || 28,148 || 12–20 ||W1
|- style="text-align:center; background:#cfc;"
| 33 || May 9 || Indians || 7–1 || Fiers (3–1) || Kluber (2–4) || — || 20,222 || 13–20 ||W2
|- style="text-align:center; background:#fbb;"
| 34 || May 10 || Indians || 0–4 || Bauer (3–0) || Devenski (0–2) || — || 23,976 || 13–21 ||L1
|- style="text-align:center; background:#cfc;"
| 35 || May 11 || Indians || 5–3 (16) || Feliz (1–0) || Anderson (0–3) || — || 24,453 || 14–21 ||W1
|- style="text-align:center; background:#fbb;"
| 36 || May 12 || @ Red Sox || 1–11 || Price (5-1)  || Keuchel (2-5)  || — || 34,982 || 14–22 ||L1
|- style="text-align:center; background:#cfc;"
| 37 || May 13 || @ Red Sox || 7–6 || Feldman (2–2) || Barnes (2–2) || Gregerson (8) || 33,148 || 15–22 ||W1
|- style="text-align:center; background:#fbb;"
| 38 || May 14 || @ Red Sox || 5–6 (11) || Uehara (2–1) || Feliz (1–1) || — || 37,430 || 15–23 ||L1
|- style="text-align:center; background:#fbb;"
| 39 || May 15 || @ Red Sox || 9–10 || Hembree (2–0) || Feldman (2–3) || Kimbrel (10) || 35,736 || 15–24 ||L2
|- style="text-align:center; background:#cfc;"
| 40 || May 17 || @ White Sox || 6–5 (11) || Neshek (1–0) || Albers (1–3) || Sipp (1) || 13,481 || 16–24 ||W1
|- style="text-align:center; background:#cfc;"
| 41 || May 18 || @ White Sox || 5–3 || Fister (4–3) || Latos (5–1) || Gregerson (9) || 14,936 || 17–24 ||W2
|- style="text-align:center; background:#fbb;"
| 42 || May 19 || @ White Sox || 1–2 || Sale (9–0) || McHugh (4–4) || — || 20,096 || 17–25 ||L1
|- style="text-align:center; background:#fbb;"
| 43 || May 20 || Rangers || 1–2 || Lewis (3–0) || McCullers (0–1)  || Dyson (3) || 28,724 || 17–26 ||L2
|- style="text-align:center; background:#fbb;"
| 44 || May 21 || Rangers || 1–2 || Ramos (1–2) || Fiers (3–2) || Dyson (4) || 35,040 || 17–27 ||L3
|- style="text-align:center; background:#fbb;"
| 45 || May 22 || Rangers || 2–9 || Hamels (5–0) || Keuchel (2–6) || — || 35,035 || 17–28 ||L4
|- style="text-align:center; background:#cfc;"
| 46 || May 24 || Orioles || 3–2 (13) || Feliz (2–1) || Bundy (0–1) || — || 24,783 || 18–28 ||W1
|- style="text-align:center; background:#cfc;"
| 47 || May 25 || Orioles || 4–3 || Neshek (2–0) || Wilson (2–3) || Gregerson (10) || 25,618 || 19–28 ||W2
|- style="text-align:center; background:#cfc;"
| 48 || May 26 || Orioles || 4–2 || McCullers (1–1) || Gausman (0–2) || Giles (1) || 23,826 || 20–28 ||W3
|- style="text-align:center; background:#fbb;"
| 49 || May 27 || @ Angels || 2–7 || Shoemaker (3–5) || Fiers (3–3) || — || 39,047 || 20–29 ||L1
|- style="text-align:center; background:#cfc;"
| 50 || May 28 || @ Angels || 4–2 || Keuchel (3–6) || Weaver (4–4) || Gregerson (11) || 38,176 || 21–29 ||W1
|- style="text-align:center; background:#cfc;"
| 51 || May 29 || @ Angels || 8–6 (13) || Feliz (3–1) || Morin (1–1) || Gregerson (12) || 36,538 || 22–29 ||W2
|- style="text-align:center; background:#cfc;"
| 52 || May 30 || @ D-backs || 8–3 || McHugh (5–4) || Escobar (0–1) || — || 24,798 || 23–29 ||W3
|- style="text-align:center; background:#cfc;"
| 53 || May 31 || @ D-backs || 8–5 || McCullers (2–1) || Corbin (2–5) || Gregerson (13) || 15,556  || 24–29 ||W4
|-

|- style="text-align:center; background:#cfc;"
| 54 || June 1 || D-backs || 5–4 (11) || Feliz (4–1) || Clippard (2–2) || — || 22,642 || 25–29 ||W5
|- style="text-align:center; background:#fbb;"
| 55 || June 2 || D-backs || 0–3 || Greinke (7–3) || Keuchel (3–7) || Ziegler (10) || 21,764 || 25–30 ||L1
|- style="text-align:center; background:#cfc;"
| 56 || June 3 || Athletics || 12–2 || Fister (5–3) || Hahn (2–3) || — || 26,458 || 26–30 ||W1
|- style="text-align:center; background:#cfc;"
| 57 || June 4 || Athletics || 6–5 (12) || Feldman (3–3) || Madson (2–2) || — || 37,223 || 27–30 ||W2
|- style="text-align:center; background:#cfc;"
| 58 || June 5 || Athletics || 5–2 || McCullers (3–1) || Dull (1–1) || Harris (1) || 30,817 || 28–30 ||W3
|- style="text-align:center; background:#fbb;"
| 59 || June 6 || @ Rangers || 5–6 || Dyson (1–1) || Giles (0–3) || — || 30,021 || 28–31 ||L1
|- style="text-align:center; background:#fbb;"
| 60 || June 7 || @ Rangers || 3–4 || Diekman (1–1) || Keuchel (3–8) || Dyson (8) || 32,189 || 28–32 ||L2
|- style="text-align:center; background:#cfc;"
| 61 || June 8 || @ Rangers || 3–1 || Fister (6–3) || Wilhelmsen (2–3) || Harris (2) || 37,696 || 29–32 ||W1
|- style="text-align:center; background:#fbb;"
| 62 || June 9 || @ Rangers || 3–5 || Pérez (5–4) || McHugh (5–5) || Diekman (1) || 30,145 || 29–33 ||L1
|- style="text-align:center; background:#fbb;"
| 63 || June 10 || @ Rays || 3–4 || Andriese (5–0) || McCullers (3–2) || Colomé (18) || 13,075 || 29–34 ||L2
|- style="text-align:center; background:#cfc;"
| 64 || June 11 || @ Rays || 4–3 || Fiers (4–3) || Archer (4–8) || Harris (3) || 19,658 || 30–34 ||W1
|- style="text-align:center; background:#fbb;"
| 65 || June 12 || @ Rays || 0–5 || Moore (3–4) || Keuchel (3–9) || — || 11,168 || 30–35 ||L1
|- style="text-align:center; background:#cfc;"
| 66 || June 14 || @ Cardinals || 5–2 || Fister (7–3) || García (4–6) || Harris (4) || 42,525 || 31–35 ||W1
|- style="text-align:center; background:#cfc;"
| 67 || June 15 || @ Cardinals || 4–1 || Sipp (1–2) || Siegrist (4–2) || Harris (5) || 42,008 || 32–35 ||W2
|- style="text-align:center; background:#fbb;"
| 68 || June 17 || Reds || 2–4 (11) || Hoover (1–1) || Neshek (2–1) || Cingrani (8) || 37,560 || 32–36 ||L1
|- style="text-align:center; background:#cfc;"
| 69 || June 18 || Reds || 5–4 (11) || Feldman (4–3) || Smith (0–1) || — || 39,111 || 33–36 ||W1
|- style="text-align:center; background:#cfc;"
| 70 || June 19 || Reds || 6–0 || Fiers (5–3) || Finnegan (3–5) || Devenski (1) || 36,369 || 34–36 ||W2
|- style="text-align:center; background:#cfc;"
| 71 || June 20 || Angels || 10–7 || Fister (8–3) || Chacín (2–3) || Neshek (1) || 22,553 || 35–36 ||W3
|- style="text-align:center; background:#cfc;"
| 72 || June 21 || Angels || 3–2 || Gregerson (1–1) || Street (2–1) || — || 25,004 || 36–36 ||W4
|- style="text-align:center; background:#cfc;"
| 73 || June 22 || Angels || 3–2 || Gregerson (2–1) || Shoemaker (3–8) || Harris (6) || 29,649 || 37–36 ||W5
|- style="text-align:center; background:#cfc;"
| 74 || June 24 || @ Royals || 13–4 || Keuchel (4–9) || Vólquez (7–7) || — || 36,195 || 38–36 ||W6
|- style="text-align:center; background:#cfc;" ||
| 75 || June 25 || @ Royals || 13–5 || Feliz (5–1) || Young (2–7) || — || 38,880 || 39–36 ||W7
|- style="text-align:center; background:#fbb;"
| 76 || June 26 || @ Royals || 1–6 || Kennedy (6–6) || Fister (8–4) || — || 36,450 || 39–37 ||L1
|- style="text-align:center; background:#cfc;"
| 77 || June 27 || @ Angels || 4–2 || Gregerson (3–1) || Salas (3–5) || Harris (7) || 36,839 || 40–37 ||W1
|- style="text-align:center; background:#cfc;"
| 78 || June 28 || @ Angels || 7–1 || Feldman (5–3) || Lincecum (1–2) || — || 38,781 || 41–37 ||W2
|- style="text-align:center; background:#cfc;"
| 79 || June 29 || @ Angels || 10–4 || Keuchel (5–9) || Weaver (6–7) || — || 36,683 || 42–37 ||W3
|-

|- style="text-align:center; background:#cfc;"
| 80 || July 1 || White Sox || 5–0 || Fiers (6–3) || González (1–4) || — || 31,965 || 43–37 ||W4
|- style="text-align:center; background:#fbb;"
| 81 || July 2 || White Sox || 6–7 || Sale (14–2) || Fister (8–5) || Robertson (22) || 35,116 || 43–38 ||L1
|- style="text-align:center; background:#fbb;"
| 82 || July 3 || White Sox || 1–4 || Quintana (6–8) || McHugh (5–6) || Robertson (23) || 30,379 || 43–39 ||L2
|- style="text-align:center; background:#cfc;"
| 83 || July 4 || Mariners || 2–1 || McCullers (4–2) || Miley (6–5) || Harris (8) || 29.844 || 44–39 ||W1
|- style="text-align:center; background:#cfc;"
| 84 || July 5 || Mariners || 5–2 || Keuchel (6–9) || Walker (4–7) || Harris (9) || 21,553 || 45–39 ||W2
|- style="text-align:center; background:#cfc;"
| 85 || July 6 || Mariners || 9–8 || Giles (1–3) || Díaz (0–2) || Gregerson (14) || 25,709 || 46–39 ||W3
|- style="text-align:center; background:#fbb;"
| 86 || July 7 || Athletics || 1–3 || Hill (9–3) || Fister (8–6) || Madson (17) || 20,933 || 46–40 ||L1
|- style="text-align:center; background:#cfc;"
| 87 || July 8 || Athletics || 10–9 || Feliz (6–1) || Madson (3–3) || — || 31,438 || 47–40 ||W1
|- style="text-align:center; background:#fbb;"
| 88 || July 9 || Athletics || 2–3 || Graveman (5–6) || McCullers (4–3) || Dull (1) || 35,312 || 47–41 ||L1
|- style="text-align:center; background:#cfc;"
| 89 || July 10 || Athletics || 2–1 (10) || Harris (1–1) || Hendriks (0–2) || — || 28,119 || 48–41 ||W1
|- style="text-align:center; background:#bbcaff;"
| colspan="10" | 87th All-Star Game in San Diego, California
|-bgcolor="ffbbbb"
|- style="text-align:center; background:#cfc;"
| 90 || July 15 || @ Mariners || 7–3 || Fister (9–6) || Paxton (2–4) || — || 29,217 || 49–41 ||W2
|- style="text-align:center; background:#fbb;"
| 91 || July 16 || @ Mariners || 0–1 || Iwakuma (10–6) || McCullers (4–4) || Cishek (22) || 41,386 || 49–42 ||L1
|- style="text-align:center; background:#cfc;"
| 92 || July 17 || @ Mariners || 8–1 || McHugh (6–6) || Montgomery (3–4) || — || 27,322 || 50–42 ||W1
|- style="text-align:center; background:#fbb;"
| 93 || July 18 || @ Athletics || 4–7 || Graveman (6–6) || Fiers (6–4) || Madson (20) || 10,651 || 50–43 ||L1
|- style="text-align:center; background:#fbb;"
| 94 || July 19 || @ Athletics || 3–4 (10) || Rzepczynski (1–0) || Neshek (2–2) || — || 15,143 || 50–44 ||L2
|- style="text-align:center; background:#cfc;"
| 95 || July 20 || @ Athletics || 7–0 || Fister (10–6) || Mengden (1–5) || — || 20,231 || 51–44 ||W1
|- style="text-align:center; background:#cfc;"
| 96 || July 22 || Angels || 2–1 || McCullers (5–4) || Shoemaker (5–10) || Harris (10) || 36,453 || 52–44 ||W2
|- style="text-align:center; background:#cfc;"
| 97 || July 23 || Angels || 7–2 || McHugh (7–6) || Weaver (8–8) || — || 35,119 || 53–44 ||W3
|- style="text-align:center; background:#cfc;"
| 98 || July 24 || Angels || 13–3 || Fiers (7–4) || Lincecum (2–4) || — || 32,721 || 54–44 ||W4
|- style="text-align:center; background:#fbb;"
| 99 || July 25 || Yankees || 1–2 || Pineda (5–9) || Keuchel (6–10) || Miller (8) || 30,628 || 54–45 ||L1
|- style="text-align:center; background:#fbb;"
| 100 || July 26 || Yankees || 3–6 || Sabathia (6–8) || Fister (10–7) || Miller (9) || 28,134 || 54–46 ||L2
|- style="text-align:center; background:#cfc;"
| 101 || July 27 || Yankees || 4–1 || McCullers (6–4) || Tanaka (7–3) || Harris (11) || 35,186 || 55–46 ||W1
|- style="text-align:center; background:#fbb;"
| 102 || July 29 || @ Tigers || 6–14 || Boyd (2–2) || McHugh (7–7) || — || 31,771 || 55–47 ||L1
|- style="text-align:center; background:#fbb;"
| 103 || July 30 || @ Tigers || 2–3 || Verlander (11–6) || Harris (1–2) || — || 34,673 || 55–48 ||L2
|- style="text-align:center; background:#fbb;"
| 104 || July 31 || @ Tigers || 0–11 || Pelfrey (4–9) || Keuchel (6–11) || — || 31,045 || 55–49 || L3
|-

|- style="text-align:center; background:#cfc;"
| 105 || August 1 || Blue Jays || 2–1 (14) || Feliz (7–1) || Feldman (5–4) || — || 20,623 || 56–49 || W1
|- style="text-align:center; background:#fbb;"
| 106 || August 2 || Blue Jays || 1–2 || Dickey (8–12) || McCullers (6–5) || Grilli (2) || 24,399 || 56–50 || L1
|- style="text-align:center; background:#fbb;"
| 107 || August 3 || Blue Jays || 1–3 || Estrada (7–4) || McHugh (7–8) || Osuna (23) || 29,399 || 56–51 || L2
|-style="text-align:center; background:#fbb;"
| 108 || August 4 || Blue Jays || 1–4 || Happ (15–3) || Fiers (7–5) || Osuna (24) || 23,190 || 56–52 ||L3
|- style="text-align:center; background:#cfc;"
| 109 || August 5 || Rangers || 5–0 || Keuchel (7–11) || Pérez (7–8) || — || 32,820 || 57–52 || W1
|-style="text-align:center; background:#fbb;"
| 110 || August 6 || Rangers || 2–3 || Kela (2–1) || Devenski (0–3) || Dyson (24) || 42,272 || 57–53 ||L1
|-style="text-align:center; background:#fbb;"
| 111 || August 7 || Rangers || 3–5 (11) || Bush (5–2) || Devenski (0–4) || — || 33,909 || 57–54 ||L2
|-style="text-align:center; background:#fbb;"
| 112 || August 8 || @ Twins || 1–3 || Duffey (7–8) || McHugh (7–9) || Kintzler (10) || 20,978 || 57–55 || L3
|- style="text-align:center; background:#cfc;"
| 113 || August 9 || @ Twins || 7–5 || Fiers (8–5) || Santiago (10–6) || Giles (2) || 22,261 || 58–55 || W1
|- style="text-align:center; background:#bbb;"
| — || August 10 || @ Twins ||colspan="8" | Postponed (rain). Makeup date: August 11.
|- style="text-align:center; background:#cfc;"
| 114 || August 11 (1) || @ Twins || 15–7 || Fister (11–7) || Berríos (2–3) || — || 25,960 || 59–55 || W2
|- style="text-align:center; background:#cfc;"
| 115 || August 11 (2) || @ Twins || 10–2 || Devenski (1–4) || Milone (3–4) || — || 24,935 || 60–55 || W3
|- style="text-align:center; background:#cfc;"
| 116 || August 12 || @ Blue Jays || 5–3 || Musgrove (1–0) || Liriano (0–1) || Harris (12) || 46,330 || 61–55 || W4
|-style="text-align:center; background:#fbb;"
| 117 || August 13 || @ Blue Jays || 2–4 || Sanchez (12–2) || McHugh (7–10) || Osuna (26) || 47,505 || 61–56 || L1
|-style="text-align:center; background:#fbb;"
| 118 || August 14 || @ Blue Jays || 2–9 || Stroman (9–5) || Fiers (8–6) || — || 47,261 || 61–57 || L2
|-style="text-align:center; background:#fbb;"
| 119 || August 16 || Cardinals || 5–8 || García (10–8) || Keuchel (7–12) || Oh (12) || 30,438 || 61–58 || L3
|-style="text-align:center; background:#fbb;"
| 120 || August 17 || Cardinals || 2–8 || Martínez (11–7) || Fister (11–8) || — || 27,508 || 61–59 || L4
|-style="text-align:center; background:#fbb;"
| 121 || August 18 || @ Orioles || 5–13 || Gausman (4–10) || Musgrove (1–1) || — || 20,288 || 61–60 || L5
|-style="text-align:center; background:#cfc;"
| 122 || August 19 || @ Orioles || 15–8 || Devenski (2–4)  || Jiménez (5–10)  || — || 34,422 || 62–60 || W1
|-style="text-align:center; background:#cfc;"
| 123 || August 20 || @ Orioles || 12–2 || Fiers (9–6) || Tillman (15–5) || — || 39,373 || 63–60 || W2
|-style="text-align:center; background:#cfc;"
| 124 || August 21 || @ Orioles || 5–3 || Keuchel (8–12) || Gallardo (4–5) || Giles (3) || 29,734 || 64–60 || W3
|-style="text-align:center; background:#cfc;"
| 125 || August 22 || @ Pirates || 3–1 || Fister (12–8) || Taillon (3–3)  || Giles (4) || 24,017 || 65–60 || W4
|-style="text-align:center; background:#fbb;"
| 126 || August 23 || @ Pirates || 1–7 || Nova (3–0) || Musgrove (1–2) || — || 28,760 || 65–61 || L1
|-style="text-align:center; background:#cfc;"
| 127 || August 24 || @ Pirates || 5–4 || McHugh (8–10) || Cole (7–9)  || Giles (5) || 23,717 || 66–61 || W1
|-style="text-align:center; background:#cfc;"
| 128 || August 26 || Rays || 5–4 || Giles (2–3) || Colomé (1–4) || — || 25,852 || 67–61 || W2
|-style="text-align:center; background:#cfc;"
| 129 || August 27 || Rays || 6–2 || Keuchel (9–12) || Snell (4–7) || — || 36,544 || 68–61 || W3
|-style="text-align:center; background:#fbb;"
| 130 || August 28 || Rays || 4–10 || Archer (8–17) || Fister (12–9) || — || 37,484 || 68–62 || L1
|-style="text-align:center; background:#cfc;"
| 131 || August 29 || Athletics || 6–0 || Musgrove (2–2) || Manaea (5–9) || — || 18,613 || 69–62 || W1
|-style="text-align:center; background:#cfc;"
| 132 || August 30 || Athletics || 3–1 || McHugh (9–10) || Graveman (10–9) || Giles (6) || 23,114 || 70–62 || W2
|-style="text-align:center; background:#cfc;"
| 133 || August 31 || Athletics || 4–3 || Feliz (8–1) || Hendriks (0–3) || Giles (7) || 20,033 || 71–62 || W3
|-

|-style="text-align:center; background:#fbb;"
| 134 || September 2 || @ Rangers || 8–10 || Griffin (7–3) || Fister (12–10) || Dyson (31) || 35,102 || 71–63 || L1
|-style="text-align:center; background:#fbb;"
| 135 || September 3 || @ Rangers || 4–12 || Holland (7–6) || Musgrove (2–3) || — || 35,538 || 71–64 || L2
|-style="text-align:center; background:#cfc;"
| 136 || September 4 || @ Rangers || 7–6 || Devenski (3–4) || Darvish (5–4) || Giles (8) || 46,025 || 72–64 || W1
|-style="text-align:center; background:#cfc;"
| 137 || September 5 || @ Indians || 6–2 || Fiers (10–6) || Clevinger (2–2) || — || 13,062 || 73–64 || W2
|-style="text-align:center; background:#cfc;"
| 138 || September 6 || @ Indians || 4–3 || Hoyt (1–0) || Kluber (15–9) || Giles (9) || 11,023 || 74–64 || W3
|-style="text-align:center; background:#fbb;"
| 139 || September 7 || @ Indians || 5–6 || Carrasco (11–7) || Fister (12–11) || Allen (25) || 12,063 || 74–65 || L1
|-style="text-align:center; background:#fbb;"
| 140 || September 8 || @ Indians || 7–10 || Bauer (11–6) || Paulino (0–1) || Allen (26) || 15,275 || 74–66 || L2
|-style="text-align:center; background:#fbb;"
| 141 || September 9 || Cubs || 0–2 || Lester (16–4) || Musgrove (2–4) || Chapman (33) || 33,841 || 74–67 || L3
|-style="text-align:center; background:#cfc;"
| 142 || September 10 || Cubs || 2–1 || McHugh (10–10) || Lackey (9–8) || Giles (10) || 41,854 || 75–67 || W1
|-style="text-align:center; background:#fbb;"
| 143 || September 11 || Cubs || 5–9 || Arrieta (17–6) || Fiers (10–7) || — || 31,939 || 75–68 || L1
|-style="text-align:center; background:#fbb;"
| 144 || September 12 || Rangers || 3–4 (12) || Kela (5–1) || Hoyt (1–1) || Diekman (4) || 22,147 || 75–69 || L2
|-style="text-align:center; background:#fbb;"
| 145 || September 13 || Rangers || 2–3 || Claudio (4–1) || Giles (2–4) || Scheppers (1) || 22,133 || 75–70 || L3
|-style="text-align:center; background:#cfc;"
| 146 || September 14 || Rangers || 8–4 || Musgrove (3–4) || Holland (7–8) || — || 25,041 || 76–70 || W1
|-style="text-align:center; background:#cfc;"
| 147 || September 16 || @ Mariners || 6–0 || McHugh (11–10) || Hernández (11–6) || — || 30,178 || 77–70 || W2
|-style="text-align:center; background:#cfc;"
| 148 || September 17 || @ Mariners || 2–1 || Fiers (11–7) || Paxton (4–7) || Giles (11) || 32,304 || 78–70 || W3
|-style="text-align:center; background:#fbb;"
| 149 || September 18 || @ Mariners || 3–7 || Miranda (5–1) || Fister (12–12) || — || 25,383 || 78–71 || L1
|-style="text-align:center; background:#cfc;"
| 150 || September 19 || @ Athletics || 4–2 || Gregerson (4–1) || Madson (5–7) || Giles (12) || 10,072 || 79–71 || W1
|-style="text-align:center; background:#cfc;"
| 151 || September 20 || @ Athletics || 2–1 (10) || Devenski (4–4) || Doolittle (2–3) || Giles (13) || 12,139 || 80–71 || W2
|-style="text-align:center; background:#cfc;"
| 152 || September 21 || @ Athletics || 6–5 || McHugh (12–10) || Mengden (2–8) || Gregerson (15) || 11,197 || 81–71 || W3
|-style="text-align:center; background:#fbb;"
| 153 || September 22 || Angels || 0–2 || Nolasco (7–14) || Fiers (11–8) || Bailey (5) || 20,022 || 81–72 || L1
|-style="text-align:center; background:#fbb;"
| 154 || September 23 || Angels || 6–10 || Ege (1–0) || Giles (2–5) || — || 29,429 || 81–73 || L2
|-style="text-align:center; background:#fbb;"
| 155 || September 24 || Angels || 4–10 || Valdez (2–3) || Gregerson (4–2) || — || 27,565 || 81–74 || L3
|-style="text-align:center; background:#cfc;"
| 156 || September 25 || Angels || 4–1 || Musgrove (4–4) || Wright (0–5) || Giles (14) || 32,958 || 82–74 || W1
|-style="text-align:center; background:#fbb;"
| 157 || September 26 || Mariners || 3–4 (11) || Storen (4–3) || Gregerson (4–3) || Vincent (3) || 24,107 || 82–75 || L1
|-style="text-align:center; background:#cfc;"
| 158 || September 27 || Mariners || 8–4 || Gustave (1–0) || Hernández (11–7) || — || 23,499 || 83–75 || W1
|-style="text-align:center; background:#fbb;"
| 159 || September 28 || Mariners || 4–12 || Paxton (6–7) || Fister (12–13) || — || 21,187 || 83–76 || L1
|-style="text-align:center; background:#fbb;"
| 160 || September 30 || @ Angels || 1–7 || Wright (1–3) || Peacock (0–1) || — || 30,112 || 83–77 || L2
|-

|-style="text-align:center; background:#cfc;"
| 161 || October 1 || @ Angels || 3–0 || McHugh (13–10) || Skaggs (3–4) || Giles (15) || 32,487 || 84–77 || W1
|-style="text-align:center; background:#fbb;"
| 162 || October 2 || @ Angels || 1–8 || Chacín (5–6) || Rodgers (0–1) || — || 28,083 || 84–78 || L1
|-

|-
| Legend:       = Win       = Loss       = PostponementBold = Astros team member

Roster

Statistics
Through 2016 season

Batting

Pitching 
Note: W = Wins; L = Losses; ERA = Earned run average; G = Games pitched; GS = Games started; SV = Saves; IP = Innings pitched; H = Hits allowed; R = Total runs allowed; ER = Earned runs allowed; BB = Walks allowed; K = Strikeouts

Farm system

References

External links

2016 Houston Astros season official site 
2016 Houston Astros season at Baseball Reference

Houston Astros seasons
Houston Astros
Houston Astros